Hail is a city in north-western Saudi Arabia. It is the capital and largest city of Ha'il Region, with a population of about 605,930 (2018) 

Hail is largely agricultural, with significant grain, date, and fruit production. Historically, Hail derived its wealth from being on the camel caravan route of the Hajj. Hail is well known by the generosity of its people in Saudi Arabia and the Arab world as it is the place where Hatim al-Tai lived. It is also the homeland of the Rashid royal family, historical rivals to Saudi royal family.

History

The construction of the Hejaz railway between Damascus and Medina, together with new inexpensive steamship routes to Jeddah, undermined the traditional camel caravan economy of Ha'il.

The city of Ha'il was the capital of the Emirate of Jabal Shammar from 1836 until the Saudi conquest of the emirate in 1921. The emirate was led by a monarchy of the House of Rashīd. The first emir, Abdullah bin Ali Al Rashid, took power with his brother emir Obaid and Jabbr's sons. Abdullah bin Rashid continued constructing the Barzan Palace in Ha'il which had been started by Mohammad Ibn Ali. After the death of Abdullah Al Rashid (in 1848) his son and successor, Talal, completed the palace.

During the Rashidi period many foreign travelers visited Ha'il and the Rashidi emirs, and described their impressions in different journals and books, including those of Georg August Wallin (1845), William Gifford Palgrave (1865), Lady Anne Blunt (1881), Charles Montagu Doughty (1888), and Gertrude Bell (1914). Rashid emirs were considered relatively tolerant towards foreigners, including traders in Ha'il:

The last Rashidi emir was ousted from power by Ibn Saud of Saudi Arabia in 1921. Ibn Saud then gave orders to destroy the Barzan Palace and also ordered the leaders of Al Rashid and Al Sabhan to move from Ha'il to Riyadh, and he assigned one person from the mentioned families, as temporary emir "Prince Ibraheem bin Salem Al Sabhan" in order to assure the loyalty from the Ha'il people and Shammar. After this, Ha'il fell into steep decline, as witnessed by E. Rutter in 1931:

Ha'il is the center of Saudi Arabia's agricultural program, and most of the wheat crops of the kingdom come from the area surrounding the city. There are also a number of dairy farms for the production of dairy products near the city.

Notable people
Hatim al-Tai was a famous Arabian poet who lived before Muhammad's preaching of Islam, and the father of the latter's companion Adi ibn Hatim and Safana bint Hatim. He was a Christian, and belonged to the Tayy Arabian tribe. Stories about his extreme generosity have made him an icon to Arabs up till the present day, as in the proverbial phrase "more generous than Hatim". There is a hill overlooking the city of Hail which has a reproduction of the campfire he lit to welcome his guests, which is turned on every night and can be seen from the center of the town. He was the ruler of his tribe. After Hatim's death, his son Adi became the ruler of Tayy. He also became a Muslim in 628 after a meeting with Muhammad.
Abdulaziz bin Mitab was the son of the third Amir of Al Rashid, he was adopted by his uncle Mohammed, the fifth amir, and brought up to be his heir. After Mohammed died of natural causes, Abdulaziz succeeded him unopposed. However, the Rashidi rule was insecure, as their Ottoman allies were unpopular and weakening. In 1904 the young Ibn Saud, the founder of Saudi Arabia, returned from exile with a small force and retook Riyadh. Abdulaziz died in the battle of Rawdat Muhanna with Ibn Saud

Geography

 As-Samra Mountain overlooks the city. This is where Hatim al-Tai lit a fire on the summit to welcome guests. Today an asphalt road leads to the summit where a natural gas-powered fire is lit at night. There is a park with a lake at the bottom of the mountain, and on the side of the mountain is the Emblem of Saudi Arabia (date palm and crossed swords) made from electric lights which are turned on at night.

 Aja Mountain (Jebel Aja) is on the opposite side of Ha'il city from As-Samra. A huge Saudi flag made of electric lights, turned on at night, is located on the side of the mountain.
 The Adayra Valley runs roughly along a north–south axis, dividing central Ha'il in two.

Climate
Ha'il has a hot desert climate (Köppen climate classification BWh) with hot summers and cool winters. It has a somewhat milder climate than other Saudi cities due to its higher altitude.

Sights

 Barzan Palace was a historic palace that used to be located in Ha'il up until the 1920s. It was built in 1808 by Prince Muhammad bin Abdul-Muhsin Al Ali over an area of more than 300,000 square meters. The Palace was completed during the rule of the 2nd Rashidi amir, Talal bin Abdullah (1848–68). The Palace consisted of 3 floors, the first had the reception halls, gardens, and kitchens. The second had the diplomatic guest rooms. The third had the royal family rooms. It was demolished at the orders of Ibn Saud after the conquest of Ha'il in 1921.
  Barzan Souk is in the place where many years ago stood the Barzan Palace of the Al Rashid extended family who governed the area around Ha'il.
 Friday Market is a traditional-style souk, held on Friday because it is a national weekend.
 Garden Mall is the largest shopping mall in Hail, it has shops like lifestyle, shoe mart, babyshop, H&M, giordano, iconic etc. "Samah Center" became the second largest shopping center in Ha'il. The third being the "Hyper Panda" shopping mall.
 Airif Fort (also spelled Oreif) is on a hill on the edge of the city. It is a mud-brick (adobe) fort built over 200 years ago as a combined observation post and stronghold. There is a beautiful view of the city from the main watchtower.
 Qishlah Fortress is an impressive sight located in the center of Ha'il. The current building was built in the 1940s while Prince Abdulaziz bin Musa'ad Al Saud held office in Ha'il province. It is the largest traditional mud-brick fortress in Ha'il and is very well restored and preserved both outside and inside. It was used mostly as a barracks. Its two floors are 142.8x141.2 meters high, its walls are 8.5m high, and it has eight large watch-towers along with the wall with two main gates, eastern and western, and has a large inner courtyard with old military items on exhibition.
 At-Turathy Restaurant is a large historical mud-brick building located in Ha'il center which is used as a traditional restaurant. Its appearance is half-restaurant, half-museum with a large number of local traditional items used as decorations. The atmosphere is very traditional, food is traditional, and seating is on the floor.
 Ha'il Roundabouts are located in different parts of the city. These have large sculptures of traditional items located in the center of the traffic rotaries which are decorative fountains. One has a Gerba (traditional animal skin canteen) built as a fountain, another has a Mabakara (traditional incense burner) with Dellahs  (traditional coffee pots) and cups around it built as a fountain.
 Ha'il Museum is the museum of the city of Ha'il. It is also one of the places where visitors can buy permits to see the petroglyphs near Jubbah Oasis, the other place being Ateeq Naif al-Shammari's Jubbah Palace of Heritage museum just off the main street in the town of Jubbah itself. The rock carvings, which are believed to date from 5500 BC are in an area that is about an hour and a half from Ha'il city by car. Tours to the Nafud desert can also be organized there.
 Aja Palace is located on the outskirts of the city. It was where the former governor of Ha'il province Prince Saud bin Abdul Muhsin Al Saud lived. It can only be seen from a distance - from the main highway nearby. It is a residential compound and as such is not open to the general public for sightseeing.
 Ha'il Desert Life Festival is an annual festival held in the province of Ha'il to celebrate and exchange experiences about desert life and culture around the world.
 Ha'il Rally is an important event in Ha'il and even in Saudi Arabia as it is the first car rally in Saudi Arabia, which started in 2006 and was approved by FIA in 2008.

Education

Ha'il University
The University of Ha'il (UoH) started as a community college, called Ha'il Community College (HCC), under the auspices of King Fahd University of Petroleum and Minerals (KFUPM) in September 1998. HCC was the first Community College to open in a planned expansion of educational opportunities for Saudi Arabian high school graduates.  HCC started by offering three-year associate degree programs in Business Administration, Computer Systems, and Electronic Engineering and Instrumentation. Later on, HCC offered three Bachelor degree programs in Applied Electrical Engineering, Computer Science, and Management Information Systems.

The University of Ha'il was officially established on 14 June 2006. The university consisted of five colleges: College of MedicineCollege of Pharmacy & Medical Sciences, College of Science, College of Engineering, College of Computer Science & Computer Engineering, and Community College. The first students were admitted on 11 February 2006. In 2007, two existing colleges joined the university, the men's Ha'il Teachers College (now called the College of Education)and the Girls College of Education. These two colleges were originally under the auspices of the Ministry of Education. The university enrollment has now grown to more than 32,000 students.

The University has several campuses inside the city, and is expanding.

Transportation
Ha'il is located on Saudi Arabian highways 65,66,70 and 400, and is connected to 3 main highways, Madinah, Buraydah, and Jouf Highways, which connect Ha'il with the northern borders of Saudi Arabia and the Kingdom of Jordan.

Ha'il has an important logistical role in northern Saudi Arabia's rail system (SAR). In 2008 Ha'il is the site of a concrete sleeper plant for railway construction. A railway (the north–south line) was completed in 2015 that extends from Riyadh to Al-Hadeetha in northern Saudi Arabia through Ha'il as part of the expansion of the Saudi railway system railway. A new SAR railway passenger station was completed in 2015. It is planned that commercial operation of this station will start in the fourth quarter of 2017 with trips to Riyadh.

Airport

Ha'il Regional Airport (IATA: HAS, ICAO: OEHL) is an airport offering both domestic and international flights, located to the southeast of Ha'il city. The airport is served by domestic carriers (Flynas, Flyadeal, Nesma Airlines, and Saudia) and foreign carriers (Air Arabia, flydubai, and Nile Air). A new international airport was planned to be constructed near Ha'il city, in the Prince Abdulaziz Bin Mousaed Economic City (PABMEC), as Ha'il has a strategic location in the Middle East because it takes only one hour by plane to reach 11 Arab capitals.

See also

 Salma Mountains
List of cities and towns in Saudi Arabia

References

G. A. Wallin (1854): Narrative of a journey from Cairo to Medina and Mecca, by Suez, Araba, Tawila, al-Jauf, Jublae, Hail and Negd in 1845, Journal of the Royal Geographical Society, vol 24: 115–201. (Reprinted 1979).
Lady Anne Blunt (1881): A Pilgrimage to Nejd, The Cradle of the Arab Race: a Visit to the Court of the Arab Emir and `our Persian Campaign` (Reprinted 1968)
William Gifford Palgrave, 1865.Personal Narrative of a Year's Journey through Central and Eastern Arabia (1862–1863), 2 vols (London: Macmillan & Co). (Reprinted many times, last in 1985).
Charles Montagu Doughty (1888): Travels in Arabia Deserta. (Reprinted many times)
Gertrude Bell (1907): The Desert and the Sown (Republished 1987)
E. Rutter (1931): Damascus to Hâil. Journal of the Royal Central Asian Society, vol 18: 61–73. 
D. G. Hogarth  (1905): The Penetration of Arabia: a Record of Western Knowledge Concerning the Arabian Peninsula.
Madawi Al Rasheed: Politics in an Arabian oasis. The Ibn Rashid Tribal Dynasty. I.B. Tauris & Co Ltd, London -New York 1991 (based on a Ph.D. thesis presented to Cambridge University, 1988). 
Lonely Planet: The Middle East, 3rd edition 2000.

External links
  University of Ha'il official website
 Ha'il city official website
 Online News Eye of Ha'il city official website

Populated places in Ha'il Province
Oases of Saudi Arabia
Provincial capitals of Saudi Arabia